The Cockatoo Island ferry service, officially known as F8 Cockatoo Island, is a commuter ferry service in Sydney, New South Wales. Part of the Sydney Ferries network, it is operated by Transdev Sydney Ferries and services the Balmain Peninsula, Greenwich, Woolwich, and Cockatoo Island areas of Sydney Harbour. Consisting six stops, the service partially traverses the former Balmain / Woolwich ferry service, which operated from 1992 to 2013. The service was introduced on 26 November 2017, as part of timetable changes across the Transport for NSW network in 2017. It replaced the Woolwich stopping pattern on the F3 Parramatta River service.

History

With the timetable changes on 10 October 2010, Birkenhead was decommissioned from service following low patronage numbers, pushing the route's Balmain terminus back to Balmain West. In 2011, services to Balmain West were limited to weekdays only.

The Balmain / Woolwich service was merged with the Parramatta River service as part of timetable changes on 20 October 2013, which also saw the decommissioning of Balmain West. All wharves previously serviced by the Balmain/Woolwich route were now serviced by the new F3 Parramatta River route. A dedicated Balmain-Woolwich route would not return until 2017, when an F8 Cockatoo Island service consisting the F3 route's inner river stopping pattern – , Balmain, Birchgrove, Woolwich, and Cockatoo Island – would be split off from the service as part of the 26 November 2017 timetable changes. The service commenced operation without Birchgrove ferry wharf which was closed on 17 October 2017 for renovation works, leaving the service with five stops until the wharf's reopening on 24 April 2018.

Wharves
[
{
  "type": "ExternalData",
  "service": "page",
  "title": "Circular Quay ferry wharf.map"
},
{
  "type": "ExternalData",
  "service": "page",
  "title": "Balmain ferry wharf.map"
},
{
  "type": "ExternalData",
  "service": "page",
  "title": "F8 Cockatoo Island ferry stops.map"
},
{
  "type": "ExternalData",
  "service": "page",
  "title": "Cockatoo Island ferry wharf.map"
}
]

Patronage
The following table shows the patronage of Sydney Ferries network for the year ending 30 June 2022.

References
Notes

Citations

External links

 F8 Cockatoo Island at Transport for New South Wales

Ferry transport in Sydney